Walter Leonard Sparrow (22 January 1927 – 31 May 2000) was an English film and television actor best known for his appearance as Duncan in the 1991 film Robin Hood: Prince of Thieves starring Kevin Costner.

Born in Eltham, London in 1927, Sparrow began his career as a stand-up comic before moving to acting with a period with the Royal Shakespeare Company. His first film role was in 1964, in Dr. Terror's House of Horrors, with Christopher Lee. Subsequent films, interspersed between countless TV appearances, included the 1969 sex fantasy Zeta One, Young Sherlock Holmes, and the acclaimed 1988 film The Accidental Tourist starring William Hurt, Kathleen Turner and Geena Davis.

His career enjoyed a resurgence in the 1990s, with Sparrow playing key roles in the 1991 film Robin Hood: Prince of Thieves as the blinded retainer Duncan, 1993's The Secret Garden as gruff gardener Ben Weatherstaff, and the 1995 American coming-of-age film Now and Then as tragic drifter 'Crazy Pete'. In 1998 he starred in Tony Harrison film Prometheus.

He received positive notice for his role in television serial The Mind of the Enemy (1965).

Sparrow's even more prolific TV appearances included regular roles in the soap opera Emmerdale Farm, as three different minor characters in 1980, 1987 and 1993, and the comedy Paris, and guest spots on Hugh and I, Adam Adamant Lives!, Randall and Hopkirk (Deceased), Z-Cars, The Onedin Line, All Creatures Great and Small, Alas Smith and Jones, Rumpole of the Bailey, One Foot in the Grave, Ernie in Birds of a Feather, and The Bill among many others.

Sparrow is also well known for playing Maurice, a peasant who was threatened to be shipped to the Americas, in the 1998 Cinderella remake Ever After.

One of his more notable guest appearances was in the 1989 episode Danger UXD of the sitcom Only Fools and Horses, which had 16.1 million viewers, as sex shop owner Dirty Barry. His last appearance was in 2000 in an episode of the BBC's medical drama series Doctors.

Filmography

References

External links

Walter Sparrow on MTEDb

1927 births
2000 deaths
English male television actors
English male film actors
English male stage actors
People from Eltham
Male actors from Kent
20th-century English male actors
Royal Shakespeare Company members